Lloyd Frederick Berryman (31 December 1921 – April 2012) was the mayor of Burlington and Second World War Spitfire fighter pilot.

Biography 
Berryman trained to become a fighter pilot at the Royal Canadian Air Force (RCAF) station in Alymer, Ontario. He was commissioned in 1943 and flew more than 200 sorties before returning to Canada in November 1944, achieving the rank of Flight Lieutenant. He was awarded the Distinguished Flying Cross for shooting down three German planes on September 28, 1944, while providing air cover for Allied forces in Holland. In April 2007, he was one of 50 Canadians given France’s Legion of Honour.

Berryman, who was born and raised in Hamilton, Ontario, moved to Burlington after 1950. He served as town councilor from 1964 to 1965 and then elected mayor from 1966 to 1967.

He was one of 60 Canadian veterans who participated in D-Day 60th anniversary ceremonies. His recollection of the ceremonies and his experiences in the Second World War, A Flyers Remembrance, are recorded on the Veterans Affairs Canada website.

References 

1921 births
2012 deaths
Mayors of Burlington, Ontario
Politicians from Hamilton, Ontario
Royal Canadian Air Force personnel of World War II